Reinier Alcántara Núñez (born January 14, 1982 in Pinar del Río) is a retired Cuban football player who played for Miami FC in the USL First Division.

Career

Club
Alcántara made his debut with FC Pinar del Río at age of 15 and played with the team until the time of his defection to the United States. Has won Cuban league MVP award in 2006 and 2007, although this has not earned him much reward in his home nation because Cuban players are not permitted to sign professional contracts.

Alcántara defected from Cuba to the United States in 2008 in the hope of a securing professional career. Following his defection he trialed with several Major League Soccer clubs, including Chivas USA who filed a discovery claim on him following the 2008 season, which means that whomever the MLS awards the claim will have first rights to sign him to a professional contract.

Having not been offered an MLS contract, Alcántara joined Miami FC of the USL First Division for the 2009 season, alongside his compatriot Pedro Faife.

International
Alcántara was a member of Cuba's under 17 and 23 teams and in 2005 made his debut for the senior Cuba national team in a January 2005 Gold Cup qualification match against Haiti. During the 2007 Gold Cup on 8 June 2007 at Giants Stadium he scored the first goal of the match against Mexico. Alcántara has been capped 18 times for the national team, scoring 10 goals, but he is not expected to make any more appearances for the national team since his defection to the United States. He represented his country in only 2 FIFA World Cup qualifying matches.

Personal life

Defection to the United States 
Alcántara's formal job in Cuba was a sports complex maintenance employee since there were officially no professional footballers in Cuba. He defected to the United States when he disappeared from his hotel outside of Washington, D.C. before a CONCACAF 3rd round World Cup qualifier against the United States on 11 October 2008.

Alcántara planned his defection before he even left Cuba. He fled from the Cuban team's coaches and security at his hotel before the match. He eventually met up with a friend who drove him to Atlanta, Georgia, where he began his legal defection to the United States.

References

External links
Miami FC bio

1982 births
Living people
People from Pinar del Río
Association football forwards
Cuban people of Catalan descent
Defecting Cuban footballers
Cuba international footballers
FC Pinar del Río players
Miami FC (2006) players
USL First Division players
2007 CONCACAF Gold Cup players
Cuban expatriate footballers
Cuban expatriate sportspeople in the United States
Expatriate soccer players in the United States
Cuban footballers